Benjamin Koon Doe (born 23 June 1999) is a Liberian professional footballer who plays for Croatian Third Football League club HAŠK and the Liberia national team. He can play both as a defender and defensive midfielder.

International career 
Doe made his debut for Liberia in a 1–0 friendly loss to Egypt on 7 November 2019.

References

External links 
 

1999 births
Living people
People from Sinoe County
Liberian footballers
Association football defenders
Association football midfielders
LISCR FC players
NK HAŠK players
Liberian First Division players
Second Football League (Croatia) players
Liberian expatriate footballers
Expatriate footballers in Croatia
Liberian expatriate sportspeople in Croatia